Fernand Dauchot (1898–1982) was an expressionist painter.

Biography
Fernand Dauchot was born in 1898 in Paris. The artist participated to World War I combats in 1917 and lost his left arm. Still, the crippled artist went to Brittany in 1923 and started to paint with other artists in Pont-Aven. The painter is famous for his superb landscapes of France's Brittany region, and his works belong to several public collections, among them the Museum of Art of the city of Quimper.

Artworks in public collections
L'Aven au Plessis, 1926, Musée des Beaux-Arts de Quimper, France

Exhibitions
 Rétrospective Fernand Dauchot, from June 11 to October 2, 2011, at the Faouët Museum, Brittany, France

Notes

Sources and external links
 Le Faouët Museum, Brittany, France
 Museum of Quimper

1898 births
1982 deaths
20th-century French painters
20th-century French male artists
French male painters
Modern painters
19th-century French male artists